Helicon (also transliterated Helikon) was a river of the Macedonian city Dion.

Helicon was briefly mentioned in stories of Orpheus. After he was killed by some of Dionysus' followers, the women tried to wash their hands clean of the blood spilt. The river sank itself so as not to become tainted with the murdered man's blood.

References

Bibliography

 Pausanias, Description of Greece with an English Translation, trans. W.H.S. Jones, and H.A. Ormerod, (Cambridge: MA, Harvard University Press; London: William Heinemann Ltd., 1918).

Rivers of Greece
Former rivers